is the first album from the J-pop idol girl group Morning Musume, consisting of only the 1st and 2nd generation members.

Overview

It was released on July 8, 1998 and sold 310,290 copies. It had ten of their top selling songs from the beginning of their career, including "Ai no Tane" and "Morning Coffee".

Track listing

Personnel 

Natsumi Abe – vocals
Asuka Fukuda – vocals
Aya Ishiguro – vocals
Yuko Nakazawa – vocals
Kaori Iida – vocals
Mari Yaguchi – vocals (except on "Morning Coffee" and "Ai No Tane")
Sayaka Ichii – vocals (except on "Morning Coffee" and "Ai No Tane")
Kei Yasuda – vocals (except on "Morning Coffee" and "Ai No Tane")
Tsunku – songwriting (except on Track 6), tambourine (Track 9), backing vocal (Track 10)
Masahiro Inaba – electric guitar (Tracks 1,2,3,5,8)
Yasuaki Maejima – acoustic piano (Tracks 1,5,10), keyboards (Tracks 1,2,5), MIDI and drum machine programming (Tracks 1,2,3,5), bongo and wind chime (Track 5), Fender Rhodes piano (Track 9)
Gen Ogimi – percussion (Track 2)
Mansaku Kimura – drums (Track 3)
Masafumi Yokoyama – bass (Track 3)
Shiro Sasaki – trumpet (Track 3), flugelhorn (Track 5)
Futoshi Kobayashi – trumpet (Track 3)
Wakaba Kawai – trombone (Track 3)
Kan Nishida – bass trombone (Track 3)
Nobuyuki Mori – tenor sax (Track 3)
Yuichi Takahashi – 12-string guitar (Track 4), acoustic guitar (Tracks 4, 5), MIDI and drum machine programming (Tracks 3, 9)
Kiyoshi Tsuchiya – electric guitar (Track 4)
Shin Kōno – acoustic piano, keyboards (Track 4,6)
Tetsutaro Sakurai – MIDI and drum programming (Track 4), backing vocals (Track 6)
Satoshi Sano – trombone (Track 5)
Kinbara Group – strings (Track 5)
Yuji Yokozeni – drums (Track 6, 7)
Masahiko Rokukawa – bass (Track 6)
Kiyoshi Tsuchiya – electric guitar (Track 6)
Hitoshi Watanabe – bass (Track 7)
Shunsuke Kurō – electric guitar, MIDI and drum machine programming (Track 7)
Ryuosuke Imai – MIDI and drum programming, turntable (Track 8)
Noriyasu Kawamura – drums (Track 9)
Chiharu Mikuzuki – bass (Track 9)
Takahashi Masuzaki – electric and acoustic guitars (Track 9)

Production
Engineers: Kazumi Matsui, Taakahisa Yuzawa, Takeshi Yanagisawa, Takahiro Suzuki, Yoshihide Mikami, Takeshi Inaba, Akimi Tani
Assistant Engineers: Ryo Wakizaka, Shinosuki Kobayahi, Hiroyuki Akita, Tomoyuki Niitsu, Kentaro Kikuchi, Hisashi Nagayama
Mastering Engineer: Mitsuo Koike

External links 
 First Time entry on the Up-Front Works official website

Morning Musume albums
Zetima albums
1998 debut albums